The Diary of a Social Butterfly is a 2008 comedy novel by the Pakistani writer Moni Mohsin. The novel was first released as a paperback on October 12, 2008 by Random House India. It is written about a social lady Butterfly, who lives in Lahore. The novel received mostly positive feedback from the reviewers. 

In February 2014, Mohsin addressed  the Karachi Literature Festival during a session for her book. Digital book was released in 2011.

A quote from her 2014 speech at the Karachi Literature Festival:

"Humour comes from tragedy while anger is what triggers satire. With satire, you speak the truth and hold a mirror up to the society."

Person in the book playing the role, 'Butterfly', is intentionally shown to be a spoiled brat attending high-society parties.

References 

2008 novels
Pakistani comedy novels
Random House books
English-language novels
Lahore in fiction
Pakistani novels